= Kelvin LaVerne =

Kelvin LaVerne (1937 - 2025) was an American artist and furniture designer.He died at the age of 88 in 2025. he was born in the Bronx, New York.
